Haraz N. Ghanbari is an American Republican member of the Ohio House of Representatives, representing the 75th district. Having previously sought appointment in 2016, he was successfully appointed to the post in March 2019 to replace Theresa Gavarone who was appointed State Senator for the 2nd District of the Ohio Senate.

Ghanbari had served on the city council of Perrysburg, Ohio since 2016, and was intending to run for re-election to the council when he was appointed to the House of Representatives. He had previously worked as the Director of Military and Veterans Affairs at the University of Toledo. He  also served in the US Army as a Public Affairs Officer. Ghanbari has served over 17 years in the Army National Guard and the United States Navy Reserve being promoted to Lieutenant Commander on Sept. 1, 2018. His service has included deployment to Bosnia in the Army and Afghanistan with the Navy. He has also worked for the Associated Press in its Washington Bureau as a photojournalist. Ghanbari is married and has two children.

External links
Ohio State Representative Haraz Ghanbari official site

References

1982 births
Living people
People from Perrysburg, Ohio
Republican Party members of the Ohio House of Representatives
Ohio city council members
United States Army officers
United States Navy reservists
American politicians of Iranian descent
Kent State University alumni
21st-century American politicians
Date of birth missing (living people)
Place of birth missing (living people)